Early Irish law texts record a wide variety of units of measurement, organised into various systems. These were used from Early Christian Ireland (Middle Ages) or perhaps earlier, before being displaced by Irish measure from the 16th century onward.

Length 

A troighid ("foot") was the length of a man's foot, divided into twelve ordlach, "thumb-lengths". These figures assume a man's foot to measure .

A magh-space was a unit set at the distance from which a cock-crow or bell could be heard. Other units such as inntrit and lait appear in documents; their value is uncertain, perhaps being equivalent to 1 and 2 fertachs respectively.

Ancient Laws of Ireland reads ceithri orlaighi i mbais, teora basa i troighid (4 thumb-lengths in a palm, 3 palms in a foot). and 

"Catalogue of the Irish manuscripts in the British Museum v.1" gives ceithri gráine an t-órdlach (4 grains in the thumb-length).

Stair Ercuil ocus a bás: the life and death of Hercules mentions ceim curadh (warrior's paces).

Area 

The basic unit of area was the tir-cumaile, "land of three cows", as it was an area of land that was at some point worth three cows. It is sometimes erroneously interpreted as the area needed to graze three cows, but it is far too large for that; in modern Ireland, a cow grazes on about 0.4 ha, so twenty or more could graze a tir-cumaile. Ireland in total covered about 870,000 tir-cumaile.

Capacity

A hen's eggshell was used as a standard unit, roughly 55 ml.

Mass

The Manners and Customs of Ireland lists two types of unge: unge mór at 20 pennyweights (31.1 g) and unge beg at 10 pennyweights (15.6 g).

A  (gold scruple) was used for measuring gold weight and was equal to a quarter-ounce (7 g).

Time

A night (oídhche) was used as a measure for time in preference to a day. As was normal for Islam and Jews and in line with the Bible (It was evening and morning of the first day), the Irish held that a new day began at sunset, not at sunrise, so that a Wednesday night would precede the day of Wednesday.

See also 
 List of obsolete units of measurement
 Metrication in Ireland
 Irish measure

References

 
 
 

Irish units of measurement
Obsolete units of measurement